Tyler Sage Alvarez (born October 25, 1997) is an American actor, known for his series leading role as Peter Maldonado in Netflix's mockumentary series American Vandal.

Early life
Alvarez was born in New York City, to a first generation Cuban American father, and a fourth generation Puerto Rican American mother. His father works for the Drug Enforcement Administration and his mother works as a nurse administrator for a private hospital. He had one older brother, Niko, who died in October 2018. Alvarez's parents divorced when he was a child and both subsequently remarried. He has two younger half-siblings, Alex and Brianna, from his father, and a younger half-sister, Sofia, from his mother.

Alvarez was educated at Fiorello H. LaGuardia High School in New York City, and at Jericho High School in Jericho, New York. He is fluent in Spanish.

Career
Alvarez's first professional acting job was in a Totino's pizza rolls commercial. In 2014, he began starring as Diego Rueda, a human with magical powers, in Nickelodeon's teen sitcom Every Witch Way. The following year, Alvarez began portraying Benny Mendoza, the eldest son of Litchfield inmate Gloria Mendoza, in Netflix's comedy-drama series Orange Is the New Black.

In 2017, he began playing the lead role of Peter Maldonado in Netflix's true crime mockumentary series American Vandal. He returned for the second season which aired in 2018. The series has since been cancelled by Netflix.

Tyler Alvarez also appeared in the YouTube satirical miniseries ¡Me Llamo Alma!, starring as Miguel.

In 2020, Alvarez made his off-Broadway debut with the Roundabout Theatre Company's play 72 Miles to Go. The production closed prematurely due to the COVID-19 pandemic.

Alvarez joined the cast of Netflix show Never Have I Ever as a recurring character in season 2.

Personal life 
On June 11, 2021, Alvarez publicly came out as   gay on social media.

Filmography

Film

Television

References

External links
 
 

1997 births
21st-century American male actors
American people of Cuban descent
American people of Puerto Rican descent
American male film actors
American male television actors
American male child actors
Living people
Male actors from New York City
American gay actors
LGBT people from New York (state)
Hispanic and Latino American male actors
LGBT Hispanic and Latino American people